Texas Jack may refer to:

 Texas Jack Omohundro (1846–1880), scout, actor, cowboy
 Texas Jack Jr. (c. 1860–1905), sharpshooter, wild west show owner, made Will Rogers into an entertainer, adopted son of Omohundro
 Texas Jack Vermillion (1842–1911), Old West gunfighter
Nathaniel Reed (1862–1950), known as Texas Jack, American outlaw
 Texas Jack (film), a 1935 American western film
 Dick "Texas Jack" Broadwell, a 19th-century American outlaw and member of the Dalton Gang
 Texas Jack, a character in the film The Great Race
 Texas Jack McGraw McGraw, a character in Danger Mouse
 "Texas Jack", an episode in The Abbott and Costello Cartoon Show
 Texas Jack's, the retail store of US firearms importer Cimarron Firearms